The Nicolaus-Cusanus-Gymnasium (NCG) is a public high school  in the German city Bergisch Gladbach. The school is named after the German church law academic, philosopher, bishop and cardinal Nicholas of Cusa.

In 1888 the private ‘Knabenschule’ (boys' high school) was established which later became the Nicolaus-Cusanus-Gymnasium. In 1958 the school moved to its new location on Reuterstraße near the city centre.

The NCG belongs to the largest schools in Bergisch Gladbach counting the number of teachers and pupils.

School Partnerships

School Sponsorship

Miscellaneous 
Pupils publish the school newspaper "Impuls".

References

External links 
 Official website of the NCG (German)
 Official website of the annual public performance 'NCG-Kultursplitter' (German)

Schools in North Rhine-Westphalia
Bergisch Gladbach
Gymnasiums in Germany
1888 establishments in Germany
Educational institutions established in 1888